Ben Hur Live is a 2009 stage adaptation of Lew Wallace's 1880 novel Ben-Hur: A Tale of the Christ. Produced by Franz Abraham with music and narration by Stewart Copeland, it premièred on 17 September 2009 at the O2 Arena in London, the first date of its European tour.

The show's dialogue is in Latin and Aramaic, and it includes a sea battle and gladiatorial combat, as well as the chariot race for which Ben Hur is famous. It is based primarily on the book as its source material rather than the Academy Award-winning adaptation which starred Charlton Heston.

Reception 
After its London première, it received mixed reviews from theatre critics.

Creative Team
Concept and Production - Franz Abraham
Direction - Philip Wm. McKinley
Music and English Narration - Stewart Copeland
German Narration - Ben Becker
Design - Mark Fisher and Ray Winkler
Horse Training and Stunt Coordination - Nicki Pfeifer
Lighting Design - Patrick Woodroffe
Choreography - Liam Steel
Fight Direction - Rick Sordelet
Book - Shaun McKenna
Costumes - Ann Would-Hard

2009 Principal Cast
Judah Ben-Hur - Sebastian Thrun
Messala - Michael Knese
Esther - Lili Gesler
Quintus Arrius - Anton Grünbeck
Sheik Ilderim - László Rókas
Miriam - Marina Krauser
Tirzah - Nina Wilden

References

External links 
 
 http://michaelknese.wordpress.com
 https://web.archive.org/web/20150402143627/http://geslerlili.szinhaz.org/
 http://www.marina-krauser.de/
 http://www.shaunmckenna.net/

2009 plays
Plays based on novels
Plays set in ancient Rome
Israel in fiction
Works based on Ben-Hur